Sze Yap Cantonese represents the second largest Han group in Hong Kong after the group of people (Punti) originating from the Guangzhou-Sam Yap region. The Sze Yap Cantonese comes from a region in Guangdong in China called Sze Yap (四邑), now called Ng Yap, which consists of the counties of Taishan, Kaiping, Xinhui, Enping, Heshan and Jiangmen. The Sze Yap Cantonese group have contributed much to what makes Hong Kong a success. Hong Kong people of Sze Yap origin represented about 18.3% of Hong Kong's total population in 1961, and 17.4% in 1971; today this population still increases as more immigrants from the Taishanese-speaking areas of Guangdong in mainland China continue to immigrate to Hong Kong.

The Hong Kong census first began counting Sze Yap as an ancestral origin in 1961, and found that it was around 18.34% of the population, compared to 48.62% for the Guangzhou and Macau region. This census found that the district with the highest concentration of Sze Yap people was Sham Shui Po.

Language
Taishanese (Chinese: 台山話, Taishanese: Hoi San Wah, Cantonese: Toi San Wah, Mandarin: Taishan Hua) is the term used by many Sze Yap people in Hong Kong to refer their Sze Yap dialect to outsiders, even though each county has a distinct accent. For example, Kaiping people would refer themselves to non-Sze Yap Han Chinese as Taishan people and their dialect Taishanese.

According to the 2011 Census and analysis done in the Routledge Handbook for Global Spanish, the constituency with the highest concentration of Sze Yap speakers was Nam Cheong Central in Sham Shui Po.

Culture

Today many Hong Kong people of Sze Yap origin have become successful in areas such as the entertainment industry, business and politics. Hong Kongers of Sze Yap origin include Andy Lau, Beyond, Danny Chan, Kenny Kwan, Joey Yung, Ronnie Chan, John Tsang and Andrew Li. The "father of Hong Kong cinema", Lai Man-Wai, has ancestry from the Sze Yap region of Guangdong province. As a result, Sze Yap people have dominated in the Hong Kong entertainment industry and play most major roles in the music and movie sectors. In many Hong Kong films, Taishanese can be heard, especially in many of Karl Maka's films, such as Merry Christmas and Aces Go Places.

It is said that over 100 famous people come from the Sze Yap region of Guangdong, making the region famous for producing more stars than any other city/region in mainland China. As a result, the local government in Jiangmen which administers the Sze Yap or Ng Yap cities of Taishan, Kaiping, Enping, Xinhui, and Heshan, decided to build a Stars Park called Jiangmen star park.

The Cangdong Dialou village has been the setting of several films. Part of the film Let the Bullets Fly was shot in Kaiping, and the movie stars Chow Yun-fat, who is of Sze Yap ancestry. It's also the filming location of The Grandmaster, an Yip Man film starring Sze Yap descendant Tony Leung.

People from Kaiping (Hoi Ping) established the Hoi Ping Chamber of Commerce Secondary School in Homantin, Kowloon.

Business
Besides dominating the entertainment industry, Sze Yap people are quite dominant and influential in Hong Kong's Business Industry, such as the Bank of East Asia (the Li family’s ancestry is in Heshan), Lee Kum Kee, Hang Lung Properties, Maxim's Catering, Hysan Development, Li & Fung, Lui Che-woo of Galaxy Entertainment Group and K. Wah International Holdings Ltd and many others.

Lee Hysan, who was born in the Kingdom of Hawaii, had ancestry in Xinhui. His company Dysan Development is now the largest commercial property landlord in the Causeway Bay area.

Hong Kong immigration
As many Sze Yap in Hong Kong who are either second, third or fourth generation Hong Kongers, Taishanese people speak Cantonese as their usual language and some may not know their ancestral origin. Therefore, that makes it hard to know the exact population, but based on the 1960s Hong Kong Census, it is probably right now about over 30% – 40%.

Statistics

1961 Census data of Sze Yap speakers by district

Average: 4.35

Standard Deviation: 2.29

Coefficient of Variation: 0.78

References

Chinese culture in Hong Kong
Siyi
People in Hong Kong
Hong Kong society